Jazz in the Garden at the Museum of Modern Art is a Teddy Charles jazz album recorded live at the Museum of Modern Art in August 1960 and released in February 1961. Music from Jazz In The Garden At The Museum Of Modern Art was later reissued under the title "Sounds of the Inner City.

Reception

In an AllMusic review of Sounds of the Inner City (a reissue of Jazz in the Garden at the Museum of Modern Art), Al Campbell stated "This is a noteworthy reissue considering that there are so few instances of Little's lyrical trumpet style and Ervin's passionate tenor recorded together."

Track listing

 "Introduction" - 0:31
 "Scoochie" (Booker Ervin) - 6:19
 "Cycles" (Mal Waldron) - 5:39
 "Embraceable You" (George Gershwin and Ira Gershwin) - 4:42
 "Blues de Tambour" (Ed Shaughnessy) - 6:06
 "Take Three Parts Jazz/Route 4/Byriste/Father Greoge" - 12:16
 "The Confined Few" (Booker Little) - 8:08
 "Stardust" (Mitchell Parish and Hoagy Carmichael)- available only in some reissues.

Personnel 
Teddy Charles - vibraphone
Booker Little - trumpet
Booker Ervin - tenor saxophone
Mal Waldron - piano
Addison Farmer - bass
Ed Shaughnessy - drums

References 

1960 live albums
Warwick Records (United States) albums
Teddy Charles albums